Tripura State Tribal Museum is a museum located within the premises of the Tribal Research and Cultural Institute at Agartala, India. The museum was conceived with the intension of promoting tribal heritage and culture.

Collections 
The exhibits of the Museum are displayed under different sections, viz., Video Wall, Tribal Life Dioramas, Miscellaneous, Auditorium, Touch screen Kiosks, Natural History, art and Crafts, Anthropology & Folk Art & Arms section. The sculptures from the Tripura region fall into four principal categories - stone, wood, metal and terracotta. The collections which are on display here, are very rare.

The library in Tripura was established in 2009 and is rich in its historical collections. There are various periodicals, journals and books relating to art, culture, mythology, biography, encyclopedic works and even the Asiatic Society journals of the country.

Notable artefacts

Events: Tribal Festivals and Celebrations 

 State Level Tribal Festival
 Folk dance competition
 Kok-Borok day

Visiting Hours 
The museum remains open 06 days from 10:00am – 5:00pm during summers and from 10:00am – 4:30pm during winters except on Mondays: 2nd and 4th Saturday and Government Holidays. Currently due to COVID-19 pandemic the museum is temporarily closed for public.

See also
 Tripura State Museum
 Tribal Research and Cultural Institute
 Lists of museums in India
 Tripura State Academy of Tribal Culture

References

Museums in India
Lists of museums in India
2009 establishments in Tripura
Tribal art
Anthropology museums
Art museums and galleries in India
History museums in India

External links 

 Official website